Cerinza is a town and municipality in the Colombian Department of Boyacá, and part of the Tundama Province subregion. Cerinza borders Belén in the north, Encino, Santander in the west, Santa Rosa de Viterbo in the south and Floresta and Betéitiva in the east.

History 
Before the Spanish conquest of the Muisca of the Altiplano Cundiboyacense, the area of Cerinza was ruled by the cacique of Tundama, present-day Duitama. The cacicazgo was part of the Muisca Confederation, the former country in the central highlands of the Colombian Andes. The Muisca spoke Chibcha and in that language Cerinza means "my throat". The village was named after the cacique with the same name.

Modern Cerinza was founded on 7 January 1554 by Melchor Vanegas, after conquistador Gonzalo Jiménez de Quesada entered the village in 1538.

Economy 
Main economical activities in Cerinza are livestock farming and agriculture (potatoes, maize, peas and beans).

Gallery

References 

Municipalities of Boyacá Department
Populated places established in 1554
1554 establishments in the Spanish Empire
Muisca Confederation
Muysccubun